Olga Kardopoltseva (born 11 September 1966 in Almaty, Kazakhstan) is a Belarusian race walker.

International competitions

References

1966 births
Living people
Sportspeople from Almaty
Belarusian female racewalkers
Soviet female racewalkers
Olympic athletes of Belarus
Athletes (track and field) at the 1996 Summer Olympics
World Athletics Championships athletes for Belarus
World Athletics Championships medalists
European Athletics Championships medalists